Belyayevka is a rural locality (a selo) and the administrative center of Belyayevskoye Rural Settlement, Staropoltavsky District, Volgograd Oblast, Russia. The population was 430 as of 2010. There are 16 streets.

Geography 
Belyayevka is located 31 km southwest of Staraya Poltavka (the district's administrative centre) by road. Novaya Poltavka is the nearest rural locality.

References 

Rural localities in Staropoltavsky District